Parlatore is an Italian surname. Notable people with the surname include:

 Filippo Parlatore (1816–1877), Italian botanist
 Modesto Parlatore (1849–1912), Italian sculptor and architect

Italian-language surnames